Abhinav Vidya Mandir is a school in Borivali east, Mumbai, India. It is located near Sanjay Gandhi National Park. The address of the school is 123/124 Abhinav nagar, Borivali east.

Schools in Mumbai